Letha may refer to:

Letha (comics) (Hellen Feliciano), a supervillain in the Marvel Comics Universe
Letha, Idaho, an unincorporated town in Gem County, Idaho, United States
Letha Dawson Scanzoni (born 1935), independent scholar, author, and editor
Letha Wilson (born 1976), American artist
Letha Raney Intermediate School, a middle school in Corona, California

See also
Austroassiminea letha, a species of minute salt marsh snail
Thecla letha, a small butterfly found in India